Kampa or Kamba Dzong,
(Gampa Dzong in Standard Tibetan,
and Gangba Xian in Chinese)
is a Tibetan town north of Sikkim. It is the headequarters Kamba County in the Shigatse Prefecture. It is marked by an iconic hill-top fort, much admired by the expeditions travelling to Mount Everest during the early 20th century. It was also used to be a border trading post for Sikkimese traders from North Sikkim, prior to the Chinese annexation of Tibet.

History 
Traditional Tibetan carpet making is thought to have originated in Kampa Dzong.

In June 1903, Colonel Francis Younghusband, serving as British commissioner to Tibet, led a diplomatic mission consisting of five officers and five hundred troops to Kampa Dzong. The objective of the mission was to meet Chinese and Tibetan representatives and discuss mutual non-aggression and trade agreements. After being kept waiting for five months before the Chinese and Tibetan representatives arrived, the mission was recalled.

Sino-Indian relations 
The Sino-Indian border along the Sikkim is well-defined by the 1890 Convention of Calcutta signed by Britain and China. Despite this, frenetic construction of border infrastructure and troop deployment has been witnessed along the border. During the 2020–2021 China–India skirmishes, one of the  first clashes was reported  at the Naku La pass, where a scuffle broke out between the Chinese and Indian forces, resulting in injuries to eleven soldiers.
It was meant to enhance ties between the two armies and maintain peace and tranquility along the border.

Notes

References

Bibliography

External links
 An abbot on a mountain, The Telegraph (Calcutta), 20 January 2006.
 Tibet a Chronicle of Exploration

Populated places in Tibet